Edward Peter Thompson (born 8 January 1983) is an English footballer who plays as a goalkeeper for Harlow Town. He signed for Dagenham & Redbridge from Wingate & Finchley in the summer of 2007, after impressing in a number of pre-season friendly matches. He was released in January 2009 after long-term knee problems and later joined Thurrock.

External links

Living people
1983 births
English footballers
English Football League players
Wingate & Finchley F.C. players
Dagenham & Redbridge F.C. players
Harlow Town F.C. players
Association football goalkeepers